{{DISPLAYTITLE:C8H9NO2}}
The molecular formula C8H9NO2 may refer to:

 Aminomethylbenzoic acid
 Benzyl carbamate
 Hydroxydanaidal
 Metacetamol
 Methyl anthranilate
 N-Phenylglycine
 Phenylglycine
 Paracetamol